Patrick Lancaster is an American YouTuber, influencer, and former US Navy sailor. Lancaster describes himself as an 'independent crowdfunded journalist', however his videos have been described as Russian propaganda and disinformation. Lancaster attained notoreity due to his YouTube videos on the Russo-Ukrainian War, having been posting videos from Donbas since 2014, initially as a cameraman, and the Nagorno-Karabakh conflict since 2020. Lancaster has frequently appeared on conspiracy theorist Alex Jones' InfoWars show.  Research by the Institute for Strategic Dialogue (ISD) identified him as one of the twelve key Western influencers spreading pro-Kremlin disinformation about the Russo-Ukrainian War.

Lancaster's videos have frequently, inadvertently, exposed information of Russian war crimes, revealing locations, identities of perpetrators, and sensitive Russian military information. The information inadvertently exposed by Lancaster has been successfully used by Ukrainian and western agencies against Russia.

Biography

Early Life and US Navy 

Lancaster is originally from Missouri in the United States of America. From 2001 to 2006 he was a sailor in the US Navy specializing as a cryptologic technician and rising to the rank of petty officer third class. He sailed on the USS Kitty Hawk (CV-63) from 2002 to 2006.

Ukraine

According to Lancaster, he arrived in Ukraine in March 2014 to cover the Maidan revolution. He settled in Donetsk later that year, after meeting the woman who would become his wife. He converted to Orthodox Christianity. He has worked for several Kremlin-backed media outlets, including RT and Zvezda, covering the War in Donbas.

Earlier in his career in Donbas, Lancaster worked as a cameraman for British journalist Graham Phillips. Phillips has later been highly critical of Lancaster, writing in 2022 that Lancaster is an  “illiterate, grifting charlatan, with a journalistic acumen and ability lower than a potted plant.” 

In his videos, Lancaster regularly asks his viewers for money, claiming himself to be the 'only journalist', or 'only western journalist' at locations where this was repeatedly proven not to be the case. This, and Lancaster's repeated filming of staged scenes, has led to multiple accusations of his dishonesty.

Ukrainian media outlet Zaborona investigated his links to the Kremlin, reporting his connection to Eric Kraus, a pro-Putin French businessman who is close to Nikolai Patrushev, secretary of Russia’s Security Council.

MH17

In 2017 Lancaster claimed to have found skeletal remains of victims of the shoot-down of Malaysia Airlines Flight 17 and pieces of the wreckage which he, after a request from the Joint Investigation Team, turned over to the local mayor with the request to transport them to The Netherlands. After investigation by the Netherlands Forensic Institute the remains were found to contain remnants of 7 passengers, 4 of which were Dutch. The Ukrainian authorities accused him of spreading propaganda for pro-Russian separatists in the eastern part of the country. In the Russian media the discovery of the remains by Lancaster was portrayed as evidence of the Dutch authorities having examined the crash site poorly and not caring for the relatives.

In 2018, relatives of the victims of the shoot-down expressed anger that Lancaster continued to show imagery of remains of the victims online. They believed he was using them in a campaign to acquit Russia from the shoot-down. The Dutch authorities urged Lancaster to turn over what he found, but as of 2022, he hasn't done so.

2022 Russian invasion of Ukraine

During the 2022 Russian invasion of Ukraine, Vice Media and NBC News described him as the most popular of the pro-Kremlin influencers spreading Russian propaganda and disinformation on YouTube. According to Bellingcat, the scene in at least one of Lancaster's videos was staged. An August 2022 investigation by Bellingcat found that one of Lancaster's  YouTube videos showed the presence of, and helped identify, a Russian soldier suspected of torturing and castrating a Ukrainian prisoner of war.

Lancaster's videos on the conflict have regularly been aired by Russian state owned media like Ruptly, Zvezda, and RT. Earlier in the conflict, his videos were featured on international media like the Associated Press, ITN, Skynews, Reuters, SPIEGEL TV. In 2022 Lancaster's sole 'international' outlet has been conspiracy theory website InfoWars.

Lancaster's videos from Ukraine gained considerable attention until July 2022, when Lancaster's output became sporadic. He then left Ukraine for an extended period, occasionally posting videos from Armenia. In October 2022, he returned to Ukraine, posting videos to his YouTube channel, and doing podcasts.

See also 

Eva Bartlett
Russell Bentley
Alex Jones
Graham Phillips
Russian information war against Ukraine

Notes 

Date of birth missing (living people)
Living people
American bloggers
Year of birth missing (living people)
American reporters and correspondents
American activists
United States Navy sailors